Helen of Anjou ( / Jelena Anžujska, ; c. 1235 – 8 February 1314) was the queen consort of the Serbian Kingdom, as the spouse of King Stefan Uroš I, who ruled from 1243 to 1276. Their sons were later Serbian kings Stefan Dragutin (1276–1282) and Stefan Milutin (1282–1321). As a dowager-queen, she held the provincial governorship in the regions of Zeta and Travunija (until 1308). She built Gradac Monastery and was known for her religious tolerance. She is revered as a saint by the Serbian Orthodox Church. Her relics, however, are now lost.

Life

Origin
Helena's origin is not known for certain. Her hagiography, written by Serbian Archbishop Danilo II (1324–1337), states only that she "was of a French family", while later continuators of the same work noted that her "family was of royal or imperial blood". 

By the beginning of the 20th century, several genealogical theories on her origin were proposed, based mainly on examination of historical data related to Helena's sister Maria and her family, including Maria's husband Anselm, who was a high dignitary of the Kingdom of Naples.

One of those theories advocated that Helena was of Angevine origin. That theory was based on free interpretation of some sources from the 1280s and 1290s, showing that Angevine kings of Naples referred to Queen Helen of Serbia as dear cousin. Based on that, some researchers started to advocate Helena's direct origin from the House of Anjou, coining the term "Helen of Anjou" (Jelena Anžujska). Despite a lack of supporting sources, the term became more popular during the 1920s and 1930s. It was promoted not only by journalists and publicists, but also by some scholars.

Stating that Helen was of French origin, John Fine assumed that she was "probably of the Valois family". 

There was no doubt that Helena had a sister named Maria, who was mentioned in several documents. In the summer of 1280, king Charles I of Sicily issued a document, allowing lady Maria to travel from Apulia to Serbia, to visit her sister, the queen of Serbia. In later documents, issued in 1281, Maria was mentioned by king Charles as his cousin, and widow of Anselm "de Chau".

Gordon McDaniel proposed that Maria's husband Anselm "de Chau, who was Captain General in Albania (1273–1274) for Charles I of Naples, was the same person as Anselm "de Keu", who was mentioned in 1253–1254 as husband of Maria, daughter of John Angelos of Syrmia. According to McDaniel, Maria and her sister Helen were descended, through their father John, from a side branch of the Byzantine emperor's family, and the Hungarian royal house.

Parents of Maria Angelina are known from her marriage licenses, issued in 1253 and 1254 by the papal chancellery. The first mentions the marriage "inter Anselmum de Keu ac Mariam, natam Matildis dominae de Posaga, natae comitissae Viennensis", while the second mentions "Maria, nate quondam Calojohanni" and also mentions Maria's maternal uncle as "imperatore Constantinopolitano, eiusdem Matildis avunculo". Those data allowed McDaniel to identify Maria's father as John Angelos, lord of Syrmia, and Maria's mother as Matilda, daughter of Henry I, Count of Vianden and Margaret Courtenay (sister of the Latin emperors Robert and Baldwin II).

Family connections of Helen and her sister Maria have been a special subject of several genealogical and historical studies that tried to resolve questions related to prosopography of various royal and noble families, including some complex questions related to Maria's husband by attribution of sources on (at least) two persons (father and son) who had the same name: Anselm de Cayeux.

Queen of Serbia

Helen married King Stefan Uroš I of Serbia (1243–1276), around 1245–1250. In 1276, conflict broke out between her husband and their eldest son Stefan Dragutin. King Uroš abdicated, and later died in 1280. During the reign of her sons Stefan Dragutin (1276–1282) and Stefan Milutin (1282–1321), dowager-queen Helen held provincial administration in the regions of Zeta and Travunia, until 1308. She proved to be a successful administrator, governing regions with mixed Serbian Orthodox and Roman Catholic population. 

Soon after that, she became a nun at the Church of St. Nicholas in Skadar, where she died on 8 February 1314. She was canonized by the Serbian Orthodox Church.

Queen Helen significantly contributed to the cultural rise of the medieval Serbian state. She had a library at her court and encouraged transcription of books in monasteries. She founded the first girls' school in medieval Serbia. One of Helen's palaces was in the town of Brnjak (sometimes called "Brnjaci") in the territory of modern Kosovo. She also possessed the town of Jeleč at Rogozna mountain. As did other members of the Nemanjić dynasty, she built monasteries and donated to churches. She built the Gradac Monastery, where she was buried, the Church of St. Nicholas in Skadar where she died, and renewed the Monastery of Saints Sergius and Bacchus. She had repaired and rebuilt many churches and monasteries around Lake Skadar that had been devastated by the Mongol invasion of 1242.

Issue
Queen Helen and her husband, King Stefan Uroš I, had at least three children:
 Stefan Dragutin, Serbian king 1276–1282
 Stefan Milutin, Serbian king 1282–1321
 Brnjača, daughter

See also
 Nemanjić dynasty
 Kingdom of Serbia (medieval)
 Zeta (crown land)

References

Sources

External links

 Gordon McDaniel: On Hungarian-Serbian Relations in the 13th Century: John Angelos and Queen Jelena
  Letter from queen Jelena of Serbia 1267 (1268)
 Letter from queen Jelena of Serbia (1289)
 Letter from queen Jelena of Serbia (1304)
 YouTube: Istorijska čitanka - Jelena Anžujska

|-

13th-century Serbian royalty
14th-century Serbian royalty
14th-century Christian saints
Helene d'Anjou
Medieval Serbian royal consorts
14th-century Serbian nuns
Converts to Eastern Orthodoxy from Roman Catholicism
1230s births
1314 deaths
Christian female saints of the Middle Ages
Burials at Serbian Orthodox monasteries and churches
13th-century Serbian nuns
Eastern Orthodox royal saints
Serbian saints of the Eastern Orthodox Church